Thomas Walker (1784–1836) was an English barrister, police magistrate and author. He is now remembered for his one-man periodical, The Original.

Life
He was the son of Thomas Walker (1749–1817) the radical, born at Barlow Hall, Chorlton-cum-Hardy, near Manchester, on 10 October 1784. His father was a Manchester cotton merchant.

Walker went to Trinity College, Cambridge, and graduated B.A. in 1808 and M.A. in 1811. He was called to the bar at the Inner Temple on 8 May 1812. After the death of his father, he lived for some years at Longford Hall, Stretford, taking part in township affairs, and tackling pauperism. In 1829 he was appointed a police magistrate at the Lambeth Street court. On 20 May 1835 he began the publication of The Original, and continued it weekly until the following 2 December.

Walker died unmarried at Brussels on 20 January 1836, and was buried in the cemetery there. A tablet to his memory was placed in St Mary's, Whitechapel.

Works
In 1826 Walker published Observations on the Nature, Extent, and Effects of Pauperism, and on the Means of reducing it (2nd edit. 1831), and in 1834 Suggestions for a Constitutional and Efficient Reform in Parochial Government. He wrote from a Malthusian point of view.

The Original was intended to raise "the national tone in whatever concerns us socially or individually", and comprised a collection of Walker's thoughts on many subjects. Its writing on health and gastronomy were most appreciated. Many later editions of The Original were published, with a reprint in 1850:

1874, with memoirs of the two Walkers by William Blanchard Jerrold;
1875, as edited by William Augustus Guy;
1887, one with an introduction by Henry Morley, and another "arranged on a new plan".

A selection, entitled The Art of Dining and of attaining High Health, was printed at Philadelphia in 1837; and another selection, by Felix Summerley (Sir Henry Cole), was published in 1881 as Aristology, or the Art of Dining.

Notes

 
Attribution
 

1784 births
1836 deaths
English barristers
English writers
19th-century English lawyers